Georg Schumann may refer to:

 Georg Schumann (composer) (1866–1952), German composer
 Georg Schumann (footballer), German international footballer
 Georg Schumann (resistance fighter) (1886–1945), German resistance fighter against the Nazi régime